Groom Lake is the official name of the USAF installation commonly referred to as Area 51.

Groom Lake may also refer to:
Groom Lake (salt flat), a salt flat immediately north of Area 51.
Groom Lake (film), a 2002 film also known as The Visitor.